The 2015 Texas Tech Red Raiders football team represented Texas Tech University in the 2015 NCAA Division I FBS football season as members of the Big 12 Conference. Kliff Kingsbury led the Red Raiders in his third season as the program's fifteenth head coach. The Red Raiders played their home games on the university's campus in Lubbock, Texas at Jones AT&T Stadium. They finished the season 7–6 and 4–5 in Big 12 play to finish in 7th. They were invited to the Texas Bowl where they lost to LSU.

This was the last season the Red Raiders finished with a winning record until 2021.

Previous season 
The 2014 Texas Tech Red Raiders football team finished the regular season 4–8, 2–7 in Big 12 play to finish in eighth place. Their two conference wins against wins were against Kansas and Iowa State.

Schedule 
Texas Tech announced their 2015 football schedule on November 19, 2014. The 2015 schedule consisted of 6 home, 5 away games, and 1 neutral site game in the regular season. The Red Raiders hosted Big 12 foes Iowa State, Kansas State, Oklahoma State, and TCU and traveled to Kansas, Oklahoma, Texas, and West Virginia. Texas Tech played Baylor in Arlington, Texas at the AT&T Stadium for the 74th meeting of their rivalry.

The Red Raiders hosted two non conference games against in–state rivals Sam Houston State and UTEP and traveled to their other non conference foe Arkansas in Fayetteville, AR. Texas Tech met the Arkansas Razorbacks in Fayetteville for the first time since 1990.

Schedule Source:

Game summaries

Sam Houston State 

The Texas Tech Red Raiders played their 1,000th game overall against #3 FCS Sam Houston State. Despite defensive problems throughout the game, the Red Raiders held on to beat the Bearkats 59–45. A Jakeem Grant 94 yard kickoff return for a touchdown in the 2nd quarter was the first time since the 2013 Holiday Bowl that the Red Raiders returned a kick for a touchdown.

UTEP 

In the annual Celebrate Cotton Game, Texas Tech's offense took off, compiling over 650 yards, to beat the Miners 69–20. With the win, the Red Raiders started a season 2–0 for the 11th year in a row. After giving up 637 yards a week prior against the Bearkats, the Tech defense only gave up 414 yards against the Miners.

Arkansas 

The Red Raiders traveled to Fayetteville for the first time since 1990 to take on the Arkansas Razorbacks. After both teams tying 21–21 at the half, the Tech defense held the Razorbacks to only a field goal in the second half, with Tech adding on two touchdowns. After losing 28–49 the previous season, Texas Tech defeated Arkansas 35–24 giving the Red Raiders their 8th overall win against the Razorbacks. With the win, Texas Tech improved to 3–0 on the season. Despite only having the ball for 23:17, the Tech offense outgained the Razorbacks with 486 yards, versus Arkansas's 424.

TCU 

After the TCU defense caused a 3-and-out for the Tech offense, the TCU offense scored on their first drive following a Trevone Boykin 9 yard pass to Josh Doctson. After trailing for the first time of the 2015 season, Tech quickly responded (in just 70 seconds) on their next drive to tie the game 7–7 with a 1-yard rush from DeAndré Washington. Momentum slowed for the Red Raiders following a high snap that went over the head of Patrick Mahomes that resulted in a safety. The Horned Frogs scored on their next possession to extend their lead 16–7. On the following kickoff, Jakeem Grant returned the kick to the 50 yard line, giving some momentum for Tech. With Washington's 20 yard touchdown run, the Red Raiders closed back in on the Horned Frogs to trail 16–14 late in the first quarter.

Early in the second quarter, the Tech special teams blocked a Jaden Oberkrom field goal attempt. A ruffing the passer penalty helped keep the drive alive for the Red Raiders, who capped it off with a 45-yard pass from Mahomes to Grant for a touchdown. With the touchdown, the Red Raiders took their first lead of the day with 13:22 left in the first half. With both teams punting on their next possessions, TCU settled for a 42-yard field goal from Oberkrom to trail 19–21 with 9:46 left in the half. On a 3rd and long, TCU retook the lead with Boykin connecting with Doctson for 52 yards for a touchdown. On a 4th and 1, Mahomes ran 4 yards for touchdown, with Tech retaking the lead with 3:26 left in the half. With 0:15 left in the half, another lead change occurred with a 4-yard pass from Boykin to Doctson. At the half, TCU lead Texas Tech 33–28.

Receiving the ball to start out the second half, TCU marched down the field. After a touchdown call was overturned upon further review, the Horned Frogs sent out their field goal unit. However, on the 25 yard attempt Oberkrom missed with the ball going wide right. The mistakes continued for TCU 2 plays later as a defensive pass interference gave the Red Raiders 15 yards following a deep pass that went incomplete. After a 3rd down play within the red zone, TCU committed an unnecessary roughness penalty that gave the Red Raiders another opportunity to score. Following the penalty, Texas Tech scored with a 2-yard run from Washington to take a 35–33 lead with 6:28 left in the 3rd. With 2:53 left in the 3rd, Green ran 7 yards for a touchdown to give TCU a 40–35 lead. TCU received their 3rd 15 yard penalty following a sideline interference call. With a false start penalty against Tech, the Red Raiders faced a 3rd and 17. On the following play, Grant fumbled the ball and recovered it. However, he failed to make the 1st down and Tech settled for a field goal instead. With Clayton Hatfield's 37 yard field goal, Tech trailed TCU 38–40 with 0:44 left in the 3rd.

On 4th and 2 in the 4th quarter, Mahomes ran to gain the 1st down, Tech's first successful 4th down conversion for the day. A few plays later TCU committed yet another foul, giving Tech a 1st down. 2 plays later Tech found the end zone with a 1-yard run from Washington to give the Red Raiders a 45–40 lead with 10:53 left to play. TCU reclaimed the lead with a Kyle Hicks 21 yard run. With the 2 point conversion, TCU lead 48–45 with 8:22 left to play. Receiving the ball, Tech started at their own 10 yard line following a penalty. Tech ended the drive with a 50-yard touchdown pass from Mahomes to Stockton. With Hatfield's kick Tech lead the Horned Frogs 52–58 with 5:55 left to play. TCU was penalized yet again on their first play following the kickoff due to a delay of game. The Texas Tech defense forced a 3-and-out for TCU, who punted the ball on 4th and 8. Going 3-and-out on their next possession, Tech punted the ball back to TCU on 4th and 4 with nearly 3 minutes left to play. With 0:23 left to play, TCU scored a touchdown following a tipped ball to take a 55–52 lead. Despite another 15 yard penalty against TCU, Tech fell to the Horned Frogs 55–52 and dropped to 3–1.

Baylor

Iowa State 

In the first quarter Patrick Mahomes connected with Jakeem Grant for a 75-yard touchdown pass. This play is the longest from scrimmage for the Red Raiders of the 2015 season. The Red Raiders set a school record with 776 yards on offense with a 66–31 win over the Cyclones.

Kansas 

Problems on special teams affected both the Jayhawks and Red Raiders during the first half. Kansas kicker Nick Barlotta missed a field goal from 22 yards, with Tech scoring on the ensuing drive, extending their lead to 20–0. Kicking for the extra point, Clayton Hatfield's kick was blocked. Closing out the first half, the Jayhawks called in kicker Matthew Wyman to make a 34-yard field goal, who also missed. At halftime, Texas Tech led Kansas 20–0.

Receiving the ball to start the 2nd half, Tech was forced to punt. With the punt, the Red Raiders failed to score on either of their opening possessions for the first time of the 2015 season. Kansas fumbled the ball at the Tech 49 on their next possession. On the ensuing drive on 4th and 23, Clayton Hatfield missed a 48-yard field goal. After failing to get on the board in the first half, Kansas scored on a Darious Crawley 10 yard pass from Ryan Willis. With Wyman missing the extra point, the Jayhawks trailed the Red Raiders 6–20 with 5:39 left in the 3rd. After a Tech fumble, Kansas defender Kans Smithson recovered it 89 yards for a touchdown. An illegal block in the back called the return to the Tech 33. On 4th and 2 from the Tech 25, Willis connected with Tre' Parmalee for a touchdown to trail 12–23. With Barlotta making the extra point, Kansas trailed Texas Tech 13–23 with 10:32 left to play. On 2nd and 10 from their own 7-yard line, Willis fumbled the ball in his own endzone, with two Tech defenders getting a hold of the ball. The ball popped out of both defenders' hands with Kansas's De'Andre Mann recovering the ball. On the next play, Willis's pass was intercepted by Jah'Shawn Johnson, who returned it 27 yards for a touchdown. With Hatfield's kick good, the Red Raiders extended their lead to 30–20.

In a game that was expected to be a blowout, Texas Tech beat Kansas 30–20. With the win, the Red Raiders improved to 5–2 and the Jayhawks fell to 0–6.

Oklahoma 

Texas Tech punted the ball on their first two possessions, with OU punting on their first possession as well. The Sooners struck first with a Joe Mixon 11 yard run for a touchdown. With Austin Seibert making the extra point, OU took a 7–0 lead. The next play for the Red Raiders ended with a Patrick Mahomes interception that was caught by Eric Striker and returned for 33 yards. The Sooners capitalized on the interception with a Samaje Perine 3 yard rush for a touchdown. With Seibert's kick good, OU extended their lead to 14–0 with 6:39 left in the 1st. On 4th and goal at the Oklahoma 1, the Red Raiders found the endzone, but an offensive pass-interference penalty negated the touchdown. Backed up to the Oklahoma 16, the Red Raiders settled for a 34-yard field goal from Clayton Hatfield. With the kick good, Tech trailed OU 3–14 with 1:42 left in the 1st.

Oklahoma scored early in the 2nd quarter with their 3rd rushing touchdown of the day, extending their lead to 21–3. At the Tech 39, OU receiver Dominque Alexander fumbled the ball, which was recovered by Tech defender Jah'Shawn Johnson, who returned it to the Oklahoma 29 yard line. The fumble recovery set up a touchdown for the Red Raiders, their first of the day. On the next possession for the Sooners, a Baker Mayfield pass was intercepted by Justis Nelson, who returned it for 45 yards. Once again, the Red Raiders capitalized on an OU turnover, with a DeAndré Washington 13 yard rush for a touchdown. With Hatfield's kick good, the Red Raiders trailed the Sooners 17–21 with 7:05 left in the half. After Texas Tech scored 14 unanswered points off of turnovers, Oklahoma responded with their 4th rushing touchdown of the day, with Perine going 10 yards. With Seibert making the extra point, the Sooners extended their lead to 28–17 with 3:31 left in the half. On their first play on their next possession, Tech turned the ball over after a Mahomes pass was deflected and recovered by Oklahoma's Frank Shannon. On 4th and 5th from the Tech 15, Seibert was brought on to attempt a 32-yard field goal. Seibert's kick was no good, going wide left. To close out the first half, Mahomes's pass was intercepted in the endzone. OU's offense took the knee, closing out the half with a 28–17 lead.

The Sooners got their first passing touchdown of the day to start out the 2nd half. Mayfield connected with Mark Andrews for a 13-yard touchdown reception, extending OU's lead to 35–17 with Seibert's kick. Tech marched down to the Oklahoma 10 yard line on their next possession, but had to settle for a Hatfield 28 yard field goal. With the kick good, the Red Raiders trailed the Sooners 20–35 with 9:16 left in the 3rd. OU scored on their next possession with another rushing touchdown from Perine. With Seibert's kick good, OU gained their largest lead of the day with 22 points. Tech answered back with a 1-yard rush from Mahomes for a touchdown. With Hatfield's kick good, the Red Raiders trailed the Sooners 27–42 with 4:50 left in the 3rd. Once again, the Sooners scored on their next possession to extend their lead to 49–27. Down by 22, the Red Raiders ended the 3rd quarter from their own 36, looking for a comeback win.

The Red Raiders started out the 4th quarter with Washington rushing 14 yards to the 50 yard line, breaking a tackle in the process. A penalty against the Red Raiders pushed them back to their own 45. Mahomes was sacked on the ensuing play, going into 3rd and 31. The Red Raiders went for it on 4th down and 11, turning it over on downs after Mahomes was sacked again. Both teams finished the game with their respective backup quarterbacks: Trevor Knight for Oklahoma and Davis Webb for Texas Tech. The Red Raiders fell to the Sooners 27–63 in their first game of the 2015 season where they failed to score at least 30 points.

Oklahoma State 

The Red Raiders received the ball first, quickly scoring with a Patrick Mahomes 42 yard pass to Justin Stockton for a touchdown. Tech originally went for a 2-point conversion, but the pass fell incomplete; however, a defensive pass-interference call against Oklahoma State gave the Red Raiders another chance. Settling for a Clayton Hatfield PAT, Texas Tech took an early 7–0 lead in just under a minute. On their next possession, the Red Raiders were pinned against their own endzone with the ball on their 3-yard line. Mahomes connected with Jakeem Grant, who took the ball all the way to OSU's 7-yard line. Tech scored with another Mahomes pass to Stockton to extend their lead to 14–0 with 9:34 left in the 1st. A Mason Rudolph pass was intercepted by Dakota Allen, which led to a 42-yard field goal from Hatfield. Oklahoma State got their first score of the day with a 19-yard pass from Austin Hays to Blake Jarwin. With Ben Gorgan making the extra point, the Cowboys trailed 7–17 with 4:25 left in the 1st. On the ensuing kickoff, Grant took the ball and returned it 100 yards for a touchdown. With Hatfield's kick good, the Red Raiders extended their lead to 24–7. After a high scoring first quarter (a combined 38 points), Texas Tech led Oklahoma State 24–14.

Tech scored early in the 2nd quarter, with Mahomes connecting with Grant for a 12-yard touchdown reception. With Hatfield's kick good, the Red Raiders extended their lead to 31–14 with 11:35 left in the half. Midway through the 2nd quarter, Texas Tech defender Jah'Shawn Johnson was ejected from the game following a controversial targeting penalty. The Cowboys scored another touchdown with a Raymond Taylor 4 yard run, trailing 21–31 with 8:14 left in the half. At halftime, the Red Raiders led the Cowboys 38–28. Oklahoma State's offense took off late in the 3rd quarter, gaining their first lead of the day with a 28-yard touchdown run from Raymond Taylor. In the end, the Red Raiders fell to the Cowboys 53–70.

West Virginia

Kansas State 

With the win, the Red Raiders broke a two-game losing streak against the Wildcats and became bowl eligible for the first time since the 2013 season. In the third quarter, kicker Clayton Hatfield made a season long 48 yard field goal.

Texas 

The Longhorns and Red Raiders completely shut each other out during the first quarter, with Texas getting the first points with a 32-yard field goal from Nick Rose. On the next drive, Texas Tech scored a touchdown after a Patrick Mahomes pass was intercepted by the Longhorns, before being knocked out of the defender's hands and being recovered by Jakeem Grant. Grant returned the ball into the end zone for the game's first touchdown. With Clayton Hatfield's kick good, the Red Raiders took a 7–3 lead early in the 2nd quarter. Hatfield made a career long 51 yard field goal midway through the 2nd quarter to extend Texas Tech's lead to 10–3. Kliff Kingsbury got his first win over Texas as the Red Raiders' head coach, beating the Longhorns 48–45.

LSU

Statistics

Scores against all opponents

Scores against the Big 12

2016 NFL draftees

References 

Texas Tech
Texas Tech Red Raiders football seasons
Texas Tech Red Raiders football